David Christopher Richards, best known as Christopher Richards (born November 29, 1961) is a Canadian playwright, theatre designer and casting director.

Life and career
Born in Scarborough, Ontario, Richards grew up in Markham and later Astorville. He studied acting at York University between 1982 and 1986, working as a dresser at the Stratford Shakespeare Festival during summer breaks.

After graduating from York in 1986, Richards formed a drag troupe, The BoHo Girls.  Taking on the mantle of artistic director and designer, Richards honed a style of visual comedy which would inform later works.  In 1994, Richards and John Wimbs Jr. authored Molly Wood, a full-length play about Alexander Wood. Initially thought of as a vehicle for the BoHo Girls, Molly Wood developed into a full-length theatrical production after the depth of the subject matter was fully researched. Opening at the Bathurst Street Theatre, Molly Wood garnered Richards Dora Awards for Outstanding New Play and Outstanding Production of a Play, Large Theatre division in 1995.

Following the break-up of the BoHo Girls, Richards began collaborating with a group of Toronto comedians, Lisa Lambert, Paul O'Sullivan and Jonathan Crombie among them, whose efforts produced a series of mini-musicals.  The end result of this creative teaming was The Drowsy Chaperone. The Drowsy Chaperone was first staged at The Rivoli in 1998, followed by a run at the Toronto Fringe Festival in 1999. Writing in Variety, Mira Friedlander cited the production values of this version as incentive for further productions. The Variety article caught the attention of Mirvish Productions and the musical was again staged at the Theatre Passe Muraille in 1999.  Richards was nominated for a Dora Award for his costume designs on this production. The Drowsy Chaperone was then added to the Mirvish subscription series with a production at Toronto's Winter Garden in 2002.  The Drowsy Chaperone went on to a successful broadway run in 2006 at the Marquis Theatre.

Throughout the 1990s Richards was a frequent contributor to Xtra!. For the last 20 years Richards has worked in casting film and TV.

In 2018, Richards and co-writer Gordon Bowness mounted a Toronto Fringe Festival musical production of "The Ding Dong Girls" with songs by Lisa Lambert at the Factory Theatre.

Plays and Musicals
Molly Wood (1994), Lovers & Madmen, directed by Ned Vukovic
The Ding Dong Girls (2018), Toronto Fringe Festival, co-written with Gordon Bowness, Songs by Lisa Lambert

Drag Shows
All-Beehive Revue Salute to Mother's Day (1989) Pimblett's
Multi-Medea (1889) 249 A Gerrard Street, Rooftop
Make-over Massacre (1989) Pimblett's
The X-mas Show (1989) Chaps
Beach Party BoHo (1990) Chaps
Scary-Boo BoHo (1990) Chaps
The Greatest BoHo Story Ever Told (1991) Chaps
Go-Go Mary (1991) Buddies in Bad Times (George Street)
Vive Lava Difference (1991) Chaps
Lost In Time (1994) Chaps
Secret Agent Show (1995) Woody's
Pooky Goes to Hell (1995) Woody's
Lady Winter (1996) Woody's
Pooky Goes to Hell (1996) The Rivoli

Costume Design
Molly Wood (1994) Lover's & Madmen, Bathurst Street Theatre
The Misfit (1995) Lovers & Madmen, Bathurst Street Theatre
Rock That Rainbow (1996) Brock & John Productions, The Rivoli
Short Leave (1997) Brock & John Productions, The Rivoli
The Drowsy Chaperone (1998) The Rivoli
The Drowsy Chaperone (1999) The Toronto Fringe Festival, The George Ignatieff Theatre
The Drowsy Chaperone (1999) John Karastimatis, Theatre Passe Muraille
The Drowsy Chaperone (2002) Mirvish Productions, Winter Garden
This Could Be Love (2003) Brock Simpson, The Poor Alex
''The Ding Dong Girls (2018), Toronto Fringe Festival

Awards
 1995 Dora Mavor Moore Award Outstanding New Play or Musical - Molly Wood
 1995 Dora Mavor Moore Award Best Production of a Play or Musical - Molly Wood
 2018 Patron's Pick Award (Bathurst Street Theatre) Toronto Fringe - The Ding Dong Girls

Nominations

 2000 Dora Mavor Moore Award Outstanding Costume Design - The Drowsy Chaperone

Casting Director
2016 to present- Baroness von Sketch Show

Notes

External links
TAPA Official Web Site

1961 births
Writers from Scarborough, Toronto
York University alumni
Living people
Canadian gay writers
Canadian drag queens
Canadian LGBT dramatists and playwrights
Canadian male dramatists and playwrights
20th-century Canadian male writers
21st-century Canadian male writers
Canadian theatre directors
LGBT theatre directors
20th-century Canadian dramatists and playwrights
21st-century Canadian dramatists and playwrights
21st-century Canadian LGBT people
Gay dramatists and playwrights